{{Infobox military conflict
|conflict    =Battle of Montijo
|partof      =the Portuguese Restoration War
| image      = Batalha do Montijo.jpg
| image_size = 250
|caption     = The Battle of Montijo (Military Museum of Lisbon)
|date        = 26 May 1644
|place       = Near Montijo, Spain
|result      = Indecisive: Both sides claimed victory.<ref>Nolan,  Montijo, Battle of (1644). Four years after regaining independence from Spain, Portugal invaded western Spain in retaliation for continuing Spanish plots against the Portuguese monarchy. With Spain still bogged down in the eighty Years' War with the Netherlands and another long war with France, the Portuguese won an easy victory that secured them from further interference for a dozen years, tough it did not bring formal peace. p.607</ref>The Encyclopædia Britannica, The first battle was fought at Montijo in 1644, between a Portuguese army of 6000 foot and 1100 horse, and a Spanish army of nearly the same number. The latter were entirely defeated, and this contributed greatly to establish the affairs of Portugal on a firm basis. p.386Clodfelter, p.43History of Portugal, The victory, due to the enterprise of Matias de Albuquerque caused great rejoicing in Lisbon p.292Sandler, Portugal won battles at Olivenca and Beira in 1642, then invaded Spain in May 1644 under General Mathias d'Albuquerque, and won a major victory at the Battle of Montijo. p.835Artola p.593The Journal of military history p.399
|combatant1  =  Kingdom of Portugal
|combatant2  = 
|commander1  = Matias de Albuquerque
|commander2  = Baron of MollingenMarquis of Torrecusa
|strength1   = 6,000 infantry and 1,100 cavalry (6 guns)
|strength2   = 4,000 infantry and 1,700 cavalry (2 guns)
|casualties1 = 3,000 dead and wounded (disputed)or about 900 dead and captured
|casualties2 = 3,000 dead and wounded (disputed) or 433 dead380 wounded
}}

The Battle of Montijo was fought on 26 May 1644, in Montijo, Spain, between Portuguese and Spanish forces. Although the battle ended with a Portuguese victory,Glenn Joseph Ames, Renascent empire?: the House of Braganza and the quest for stability in Portuguese monsoon Asia c.1640–1683 Amsterdam University Press (2000) , The most notable Portuguese victories came at Montijo (1644) and Arronches (1653). p.23 the Spanish saw it as a strategic success as they claimed to have prevented Matias de Albuquerque from capturing Badajoz, despite Albuquerque having no intention of attacking the city.Ericeira, p.51 Due to the chaotic nature of the battle, casualty figures vary.

Background
Portuguese General Matias de Albuquerque knew the Spanish were commanded by the Marquis of Torrecusa, a renowned military tactician, and wanted to affirm his own presence. He managed to gather 6,000 infantry, 1,100 cavalry and 6 cannons, in order to give battle. He crossed the frontier attacking, pillaging and burning Vilar del Rey, Puebla and Boca de Manfarete until reaching the town of Montijo, which surrendered without a fight.

Battle
Not having encountered the Spanish army, Matias de Albuquerque decided to return to Alentejo. While on march, the Portuguese were confronted by a Spanish force from Torrecusa's army led by the Baron of Mollingen consisting of 4,000 infantry and 1,700 cavalry. On 26 May 1644 the two armies met not far from Montijo.

The forces of Mollingen adopted a semi circle formation, which would permit a simultaneous attack on the Portuguese front and flanks. Matias de Albuquerque, marching in a slow pace towards Portugal, had prepared for a rear attack by placing the infantry in two defensive lines with the strongest formations in the rear, the baggage wagons in the vanguard and the cavalry split between the two flanks.

The six cannons of the Portuguese initiated the hostilities, the Spanish side soon replied, but very ineffectively. The Spanish cavalry attacked the Portuguese left flank, routing the 150 Dutch cavalry commanded by Captain Piper.History of Portugal, p.292 The panic spread to the rest of the cavalry on both flanks who abandoned the field through their own lines, taking refuge in woods near Xévora, leaving the infantry disorganized. Led by Mollingen himself, the Spanish cavalry easily opened a breach in the centre of the Portuguese positions, taking the Portuguese artillery. Thinking that the Battle was won, Mollingen troops scattered themselves without care on the field looting. Albuquerque's horse was killed and he was found fighting on foot by a French officer named Lamorlé (fighting for the Portuguese) who gave him his own horse.

Taking advantage of the Spanish lack of reserves and dispersion, Matias de Albuquerque and his officers rallied some of the scattered troops and quickly retook the Portuguese artillery. D. João da Costa, a Portuguese artillery officer, efficiently used the artillery to stop the Spanish forces from regrouping. The rallied Portuguese troops took back the field,Disney p.226 and drove the Spaniards across the Guadiana inflicting heavy losses.H.V.Livermore, Albuquerque rallied his men and drove the Spanish troops across the Guadiana with heavy losses. p.179

Aftermath
On the following day the Portuguese troops returned to Campo Maior. Both sides claimed victory, as well as having caused high casualties to each other. When news of the victory achieved by Albuquerque reached King John IV of Portugal he awarded the general with the title of Count of Alegrete. Madrid, as well as Lisbon rejoiced with news of the battle that had great repercussion in the European courts.Edward McMurdo p.392

In culture
The Spanish playwrights Pedro Francisco Lamini and Sr. Durán composed respectively the comedy El más valiente Extremeño, Bernardo del Montijo, el segundo Don Rodrigo Díaz de Vivar and the poem in his collection Romances vulgares de valentías, guapezas y desafueros in honor to the Battle. The Portuguese João Soares da Gama also did it in his Batalha do Montijo.

 References 

Bibliography
Tony Jaques, Dictionary of Battles and Sieges: F-O. Greenwood Publishing Group, (2007) 
Stanley Sandler, Ground warfare: an international encyclopedia, Volume 1. ABC-CLIO, (2007) 
Micheal Clodfelter: Warfare and armed conflicts: a statistical reference to casualty and other figures, 1500–2000. McFarland, (2002) 
Edmund Wright, Thomas Edmund Farnsworth Wright: A Dictionary of World History. Oxford University Press, (2006) 
Luis de Menezes Ericeira (conde da), Historia de Portugal restaurado: 1643–1656 (1751)
Benjamin Vincent, A Dictionary of Biography – Past and Present – Containing the Chief Events in the Lives of Eminent Persons of all Ages and Nations. Preceded by the Biographies and Genealogies of the Chief Representatives of the Royal Houses of the World. READ BOOKS, (2008) 
Carlos Afonso dos Santos, Carlos Selvagem, Portugal militar. Imprensa Nacional, (1931)
H. V. Livermore: A new History of Portugal. Cambridge University Press Archive, (1976) The Encyclopædia Britannica, or Dictionary of Arts, Sciences, and General Literature: Pla – Rei, Volume 18 (1859).History of Portugal: pamphlet collection CUP Archive, (197?). 
Miguel Artola: Enciclopedia de Historia de España: Diccionario temático. Alianza Ed. (2007) 
Juan Contreras y López de Ayala Lozoya (marqués de): Historia de España: La "Edad Antigua" Americana a la política exterior de Felipe IV. Salvat Editores (1968).
Eduardo Ibarra y Rodríguez: España Bajo los Austrias. Editorial Labor. (1979) 
Enrique García Hernán, Davide Maffi: Guerra y Sociedad en la Monarquía Hispánica: política, estrategia y cultura en la Europa Moderna, 1500–1700, Volume 1. Laberinto. (2006) 
Virginia Military Institute, George C. Marshall Foundation, American Military Institute: The Journal of Military History, Volume 71, Issues 1–2. American Military Institute (2007).
Jordi Ventura i Subirats: Historia de España: Desde los Reyes Católicos hasta Carlos, Volume 3. Plaza y Janés. (1976) 
Real Academia de la Historia, Memorial histórico Espãnol: Memorial histórico español: coleccion de documentos, opúsculos y antigüedades. Real Academia de la Historia (1865).
Antonio Valladares de Sotomayor: Semanario erudito que comprehende varias obras ineditas, criticas, morales, instructivas, políticas, históricas, satíricas, y jocosas de nuestros mejores autores antiguos y modernos, Volume 33. Blas Román (1790).
Disney A. R A History of Portugal and the Portuguese Empire: From Beginnings to 1807 (Volume 1) Cambridge University Press; 1st edition (2009) 
Ângelo Ribeiro: História de Portugal: A Restauração da Independência-O Início da Dinastia de Bragança (2004) 
Cathal J. Nolan: The Age of Wars of Religion, 1000–1650: an encyclopedia of global warfare and civilization (2006). 
Edward McMurdo:The History of Portugal – From the Reign of D. Joao II. to the Reign of D. Joao V. – Volume III., Volume 3 (2010).
David Eggenberger: An encyclopedia of Battles: accounts of over 1,560 battles from 1479 B.C. to the present. (1985) 
Robin Erica Wagner-Pacifici: The art of surrender: decomposing sovereignty at conflict's end. University of Chicago Press. (2005) 
Modesto Lafuente: Historia general de España, Volume 16. Establecimiento Tipográfico de Mellado (1856).
Nicolás Díaz y Pérez: Historia de Talavera la Real: villa de la provincia de Badajoz''. Editorial MAXTOR. (2005)

External links
 The Battle of Montijo  26 May 1644   Spanish Victory (Tactical). Spanish Tercios from 1525 to 1704.

Montijo
Montijo
Conflicts in 1644
Montijo
1644 in Europe
1644 in Spain
Montijo
1644 in Portugal
Montijo, Portugal